The Sporting News Men's College Basketball Coach of the Year Award, often informally called the "Sporting News Coach of the Year Award," is an annual basketball award given to the best men's college basketball head coach in NCAA Division I competition. The award was first given in 1964 following the 1963–64 season and is presented by Sporting News (formerly The Sporting News), a United States–based sports magazine that was established in 1886.

No award winner was selected in 1965.

John Wooden is the only person to receive the award four times. Bill Self has three awards, and John Calipari, Denny Crum, Rick Pitino, Adolph Rupp, and Tubby Smith have two each.

Kentucky head coaches have received the award five times. UCLA has been honored four times, all during the Wooden era. Kansas coaches have three awards.

Key

Winners

Winners by school
Schools are listed here by their current athletic brand names, which do not necessarily match those used at the time an award was presented.

Footnotes

References

Awards established in 1964
College basketball trophies and awards in the United States